1A or 1-A may refer to:

Arts and entertainment
 1A (comics), a comic book robot
 1A (radio program), an American radio program

Politics
 
 First Amendment (disambiguation), the first amendment of various legislation

Science and technology
 Group 1A, an obsolete designation for the group 1 elements
 AMY1A, a human gene
 Alpha-1A adrenergic receptor, a human gene
 Interferon beta-1a, a drug 
 Meltwater pulse 1A, a period of rapid post-glacial sea level rise, 13,500–14,700 years ago
 Melatonin receptor 1A, a human gene
 Metallothionein 1A, a human gene
 MH-1A, a nuclear power reactor and the first floating nuclear power station
 Vasopressin receptor 1A, a major receptor type for vasopressin

Sports
 Croatian 1A Volleyball League
 1. A SKL, the 2002–2006 name of Premier A Slovenian Basketball League

Transportation, military and space
 Adcox 1-A, an American 1929 biplane
 Astra 1A, a 1988 satellite 
 Class 1-A, an American military service classification
 Little Joe 1A, a 1959 unmanned NASA launch
 Mercury-Redstone 1A, a 1969 NASA mission
 Packard 1A-1500, a 1929 piston aircraft engine
 Shin Meiwa US-1A, a Japanese anti-submarine warfare aircraft
 Sisu 1A, an American 1950s sailplane
 Türksat 1A, a Turkish satellite
 List of highways numbered 1A

See also
 
 A1 (disambiguation)
 IA (disambiguation)